is a Japanese football club based in Tokyo.

It is the oldest Japanese football club, founded in 1917, and it was the first to win the Emperor's Cup, the top national cup in Japan. Very much like Sheffield F.C. in England or Queen's Park F.C. in Scotland, its staunch amateur ideals forced it by the wayside as company clubs, and later fully professionalized clubs, took over the game.

The club now participates in the Tokyo Shakaijin League Division 1, seventh level of the Japanese football league system, since its founding in 1967. It earned second place in 1978 and 1983. Its farm team, Tōshū club also participates in the prefectural league.

Titles
 Emperor's Cup: 1921.
 Tokyo Shakaijin League: 2016.

References 
 創立100年。初代天皇杯王者！日本最古のサッカークラブチーム『東京蹴球団』に見るマインドとは

External links
 Tokyo Soccer Club Official site

Football clubs in Japan
Association football clubs established in 1917
Emperor's Cup winners
Football clubs in Tokyo
1917 establishments in Japan